"Hope' is the thing with feathers" is a lyric poem in ballad meter written by American poet Emily Dickinson, The manuscript of this poem appears in Fascicle 13, which Dickinson compiled around 1861. It is one of 19 poems included in the collection, in addition to the poem "There's a certain Slant of light." With the discovery of Fascicle 13 after Dickinson's death by her sister, Lavinia Dickinson, "'Hope' is the thing with feathers" was subsequently published in 1891 in a collection of her works under the title Poems, which was edited and published by Thomas Wentworth Higginson and Mabel Loomis Todd.

History of publication 
"'Hope' is the thing with feathers" was first compiled in one of Dickinson's hand-sewn fascicles, which was written during and put together in 1861. In the 1999 edition of The Poems of Emily Dickinson: Reading Edition, R.W. Franklin changed the year of appearance from 1861, where the holograph manuscript exists, to 1862. It is listed in the appendix that poems numbered 272 to 498 were written during this year, which amounted to the third most poems Dickinson wrote in the span of years from 1860 to 1865, at 227. The edition that Dickinson included in the fascicle was text B, according to Franklin. No current holograph manuscript exists of the first written version of this selection. "'Hope' is the thing with feathers" first appeared in print in a Poems by Emily Dickinson, second series in 1891. It was published by Roberts Brothers in Boston.

Upon the original publication, her poems were reassessed and transcribed by Thomas H. Jefferson in 1955. They became the first scholarly collection of Dickinson's work. His transcription of her works from her fascicles was taken from the earliest fair copy of her poetic works. Within the Johnson collection, "'Hope' is the thing with feathers" is poem number 254. Franklin, in his edition of her works, used the last fair copy of her poems. It is marked as number 314 in his collection and can be found under such in the Norton Anthology of Poetry.

Fascicle 13 
Fascicle 13 is the bound edition of her written poetry that contains "'Hope' is the thing with feathers" written in Dickinson's hand. According to the work done by Franklin, there are similarities in the materials used for this fascicle and with Fascicles 11–13, 14, as well as Fascicles 9,11, and 12. Some distinct markers of Fascicle 13 include a woven-style of stationery, with paper that is cream in appearance with a blue rule line on it. It also is decorated in an embossed style that frames the page with "a queen's head above the letter 'L'." To view the holograph manuscript of this in person, the Houghton Library at Harvard University houses it.

Analysis 

In her analysis of the poem, scholar Helen Vendler, states that the opening foot of the poem is "reversed," adding more color and emphasis on the word "Hope." Dickinson implements the use of iambic meter for the duration of the poem to replicate that continuation of "Hope's song through time." Most of Dickinson's poetry contains quatrains and runs in a hymnal meter, which maintains the rhythm of alternating between four beats and three beats during each stanza. "'Hope' is the thing with feathers" is broken into three stanzas, each set containing alternating lines of iambic tetrameter and iambic trimeter, totaling in twelves lines altogether. In addition, despite Mr. Lin's theorizing, it is not actually about a bird.

Form 
In Victoria N. Morgan's text, Emily Dickinson and Hymnal Culture: Tradition and Experience, she writes that Dickinson's poetry may have been influenced by eighteenth-century hymn culture, such as Isaac Watts, and female hymnal writers, Phoebe Hinsdale Brown and Eliza Lee Follen. Morgan postulates that their works were introduced to Dickinson early in her life when she was attending church regularly. She believes that the "simplicity" of the hymnal form allowed room for Dickinson to make this "an easy target for parody."

Theme of poem 
The poem calls upon the imagery of seafaring adventures with the use of the word "Sea" and "Gale." Dickinson uses the metaphor of "Hope" being likened unto a bird that does not disappear when it encounters hardships or "storms." Vendler writes that Dickinson enjoys "the stimulus of teasing riddles," which is in use as she plays with the idea of "Hope" being a bird. Dickinson makes an allusion to "Hope" being something that does not disappear when the "Gale" and "storm" get worse and its song still sings on despite the intensity of whatever is attempting to unseat it. She also makes note that no matter what the speaker of the poem is doing, "Hope" does not leave even if they offer nothing in return to it.

Punctuation 
Throughout the poem, Dickinson uses dashes liberally, ending nine lines out of twelve with them. In addition to the use of dashes, she employs capitalization of common nouns, such as "Hope," "Bird," and "Extremity." Scholar Ena Jung writes that Dickinson's dashes are among the most "widely contested diacriticals" in contemporary literary discussions. John Lennard, in his Poetry Handbook, states that Dickinson's poems rely heavily her use of dashes, capitalizations of particular words and her line/stanza breaks, with "'Hope' is the thing with feathers" falling into that categorization. He continues on stating that her "intense, [and] unexpected play" with her use of capitalization and dashes makes her poetry "memorable." When reading the poem aloud, the dashes create caesura, causing the brief poem to be read in a staccato'd rhythm. Jung claims that the use of Dickinson's dashes in her poetry creates a "visible breath" to the speaker that is delivering the poetry.

Symbolism 
In her poem, Dickinson describes "hope" as a bird, which is being used as a metaphor for the idea of salvation. Dickinson has nine variations of the word "hope," which can be interpreted in multiple ways. Morgan writes that Dickinson often writes about birds when she is describing acts of worship, which coincides with the format of the hymn. Birds in Christian iconography are often represented as a dove. Dickinson uses many allusions to nature in her poems. Within this poem, she takes the image of the bird and the violence of weather to create a balance between the destructive and the beneficent. It is also a juxtaposition of the interior world and exterior, with the soul considered "interior" and the storms that attempt to dismantle hope being the "exterior."

Due to the riddle-like nature of her poems, as well as the extensive use of her lexicon, "'Hope' is the thing with feathers" can be interpreted through multiple shades of meaning.

Critical reception 
Dickinson's poems are lauded as mysterious and enigmatic and typically have a volta, or turn in topic, at the end, such as "Because I could not stop for Death." "'Hope' is the thing with feathers," while possessing a similar quality, is considered "childlike" by some critics due to the simplicity of the work. Vendler expands on this idea by stating it is also due to the way that Dickinson constructs her poems in quatrains and hymnal meter, which can be seen as simplistic. Morgan argues that because of Dickinson's "antagonistic relation" she has with nineteenth-century Christianity, the poet gives a "reassessment of spirituality" through this poem by the use of the image of the bird and the Christian conception of "hope."

Derivative works 
"'Hope' is the thing with feathers" has been adapted to music to be performed by choirs. There are multiple versions of the song. Most notable of the adaptations is the Susan LaBarr version that was written for women's choir and intended to be accompanied by piano. Additional musical adaptations of the poem are also done by Robert Sieving, Emma Lou Diemer and Paul Kelly.

Alternative country band, Trailer Bride, titled their final album, Hope Is a Thing with Feathers. The title of the album is a variant of the name of the poem. The title track of the album is an adaptation of the poem written by Dickinson, where she receives a writing credit.

Citations

External links 

"'Hope' is the thing with feathers" at the Poetry Foundation website
Michigan State University's Children's Choir performing "'Hope' is the thing with feathers
Trailer Bride's "Hope is a Thing with Feathers

Poetry by Emily Dickinson
Poems published posthumously
1891 poems
1861 poems
Works about emotions